Mihajlovac may refer to the following places in Serbia:

 Mihajlovac (Negotin), a village in the municipality of Negotin
 Mihajlovac (Smederevo), a village in the municipality of Smederevo